Víctor Morlán Gracia (born 9 May 1947) is a Spanish politician. He served as Secretary of State for Planning and Institutional Relations from 2008 to 2009 and as Secretary of State for Planning and Infrastructure from 2004 to 2008 and from 2009 to 2011 in the Ministry of Public Works and Transport in the government of José Luis Rodríguez Zapatero. Morlán graduated in law, and joined the civil service in 1986.

He has been a member of the Spanish Socialist Workers' Party (PSOE) since 1978, and was elected to the Congress of Deputies in 1986 for the province of Huesca (Aragon). He was named Secretary of State for Planning and Infrastructure, the number two position in the Ministry of Public Works and Transport, in 2004. The post was renamed Secretary of State for Planning and Institutional Relations after the 2008 elections. Morlán resigned his seat in the Congress of Deputies after his reappointment as Secretary of State so as to dedicate himself to his position in government: he was replaced by María Teresa Villagrasa Pérez, who had been number three on the PSOE list for Huesca in the 2008 elections.

References
Personal page at the Ministry of Public Works and Transport
Biography from the Congress of Deputies
Profile and related news stories from ''El País
Profile in El Mundo
Profile in Via Libre

1947 births
Living people
People from Huesca
Members of the 3rd Congress of Deputies (Spain)
Members of the 4th Congress of Deputies (Spain)
Members of the 5th Congress of Deputies (Spain)
Members of the 6th Congress of Deputies (Spain)
Members of the 7th Congress of Deputies (Spain)
Members of the 8th Congress of Deputies (Spain)
Members of the 9th Congress of Deputies (Spain)
Spanish Socialist Workers' Party politicians
Secretaries of State of Spain